The Oued Bouaïcha massacre took place about 150 miles (240 km) south of Algiers, near Djelfa, on March 26, 1998, during the Algerian Civil War. Forty-seven people, including 27 children under the age of sixteen, were killed at Oued Bouaïcha in the municipality of Bouire Lahdab, near Had Sahary, by about fifteen men carrying axes and knives, who also kidnapped three young women. On the same day, another eleven people were killed on the other side of the country at Youb.

See also
List of massacres in Algeria

References

External links
 Irish Examiner
 ANB-BIA
 ChannelAfrica

Conflicts in 1998
Algerian massacres of the 1990s
1998 in Algeria
Massacres in 1998
March 1998 events in Africa